Retrato de Familia  (English: Family Portrait)  is a 1976 Spanish film directed by Antonio Giménez-Rico. It stars Antonio Ferrandis, Amparo Soler Leal and Miguel Bosé, making his film debut. This is Giménez-Rico's best known film. The script was written by him, based on the novel Mi idolatrado hijo Sisi (My Beloved Son Sisi), by Miguel Delibes. The film was shot in Burgos, the director's birthplace, although the novel takes place in Cáceres.

Plot
Spain in the 1930s. The Rubes clan is headed by the aristocratic father Cecilio, a roué in love with another woman, Paulina, although he lives with his wife and his teenage son, Sisi. His wife hates the thought and practice of normal sexuality in their marriage. Their son notes his parents' sexual frustrations but must experience his own initiation into the mysteries of love and sex. We watch Sisi grows, mature, and compete with his father for the attentions and sexual favors of the local actresses in Burgos.

One day, quite by chance, Sisi meets Paulina, his father's more or less discarded lover, and they begin a tumultuous affair. Sisi is then inducted  into the army and goes off to war. News of his death arrives quickly. Apparently, Sisi was killed by a land mine while driving his army truck. His father wants his wife  to bear him another son, but she refuses. The old man, broken hearted by Sisi's death, returns to his former mistress Paulina, who tells him she is pregnant by his own son. With no other legal heirs, the elder Cecilio Rubes, desperate, jumps off his mistress's balcony and commits suicide. Paulina had always wanted the elder Rubes's child but is now content with having one sired by his son.

Cast 
Antonio Ferrandis as Cecilio Rubes
Amparo Soler Leal  as Adela Rubes
Mónica Randall  as Paulina
Miguel Bosé as  Sisi Rubes
Gabriel Llopart as Luis Sendin
Encarna Paso as Gloria Sendin

References

External links 
Schwartz, Ronald, The Great Spanish Films: 1950 - 1990, Scarecrow Press, London, 1991, 

1976 films
Spanish drama films
1970s Spanish-language films
Spanish Civil War films
1976 drama films
Films directed by Antonio Giménez-Rico